Dorothy Mabel Reed Mendenhall (September 22, 1874–July 31, 1964) was a prominent pediatric physician specializing in cellular pathology. In 1901, she discovered that Hodgkin's disease was not a form of tuberculosis, by noticing the presence of a special cell, the Reed–Sternberg cell which bears her name. Dorothy was one of the first women to graduate from Johns Hopkins School of Medicine. She was also one of the first professionally trained female physicians of the late 19th and early 20th centuries.

Early life 
Dorothy Mabel Reed was born on September 22, 1874 in Columbus, Ohio, the third child to parents Grace Kimball and William Pratt Reed. A child of privilege, Dorothy lived on a large estate with her parents, brother, sister, aunts, uncles, and several cousins. By the age of thirteen, Dorothy had learned the basics of education, such as reading and writing, despite her lack of schooling. Around this time, Anna C. Gunning, a governess, was hired to help teach and guide Dorothy to success. In 1880, William Reed died of diabetes and tuberculosis, leaving the family with a large sum of money. This money would be how the family could afford to hire Gunning to give Dorothy an education that was characteristic of a well-off family.

Education
Other than the teaching that she received from Gunning, Mendenhall also enrolled in art classes at Columbus Art School, as well as received tutoring by her grandmother from time to time. In 1891, Dorothy began her college education at Smith College, where she would later graduate in 1895.

There, Mendenhall discovered her passion for medicine in a biology class during her sophomore year. After discovering that Johns Hopkins School of Medicine had begun to accept women, Dorothy took the required science courses at MIT and later applied to the school, becoming one of the very few women to attend at this time. This decision was made, in part, to help her family out of the financial burden they were facing due to overspending. While attending MIT, Mendenhall faced many negative attitudes and comments made by male students and professors, which equipped her with the ability to ignore the continued negativity, directed toward women in medicine, while she attended Johns Hopkins.

Dorothy graduated fourth in her class in 1900 and was awarded a prestigious internship at Johns Hopkins Hospital, serving under William Osler. Originally, Dr. Osler told Dorothy the internship was "not a place for women," although he later said he did not want to be seen as hostile to women entering the medical school. Being accepted as a professional peer was a continual challenge to Reed in the male-dominated field of medicine at that time. Both professors and other students told her they thought that a medical education was "wasted" on a woman, since they thought she would eventually get married, have children, and never practice medicine. After receiving the opportunity from Osler, Paul Woolley, one of Mendenhall's colleagues, threatened to leave the city if she did not hand it over to him. This event would inspire Dorothy and further her drive for the medical profession as a woman.

Work 
Dorothy and her colleagues were more interested in working in medicine than in spearheading a feminist movement,
 and her diary reflected this, with some entries discussing how some female students were overly sensitive, for which she had little tolerance. Dorothy and her classmates, Margaret Long and Florence Sabin, were viewed as a different kind of female physician—ones who were not especially concerned with the feminist movement.

In 1901, she became a Pathology fellow there under the direction of Dr. William Welch. This is where Mendenhall began researching Hodgkin's disease. As she continued her work in pathology, Reed also taught bacteriology and assisted with autopsies. In 1901, when she was only 28, Reed made her most recognized contribution to medical science: the discovery of the Reed-Sternberg cell, which she identified as a diagnostic marker for Hodgkin's lymphoma. Tuberculosis and Hodgkin's disease shared many similarities, so she compared tissue samples from tuberculosis and Hodgkin's patients, observing in Hodgkins patients a large distinctive cell that was not seen in tuberculosis patients. She was able to do this by using infected patients' lymph nodes to treat rabbits. This cell would initially be named the Dorothy Reed cell, before later being named the Reed-Sternberg cell. Reed effectively disproved the then-common belief that Hodgkin's lymphoma was a subtype of tuberculosis. She also determined that men and young adults are among the most vulnerable to the disease. She published her findings in 1902.

Welch was very impressed with Dorothy's success, and offered her an extension of her fellowship. She respectfully declined due to the worsening financial burden of her family. She inquired with Welch about assisting him in teaching, but to Dorothy's dismay, he told her that women were not offered teaching positions. After declining the extended fellowship, Reed accepted an internship in pediatrics at the Babies Hospital in New York City, part of the Columbia-Presbyterian Medical Center. In January 1903 she became the first resident physician there. She worked under the direction of L. E. Holt, a pioneer of pediatrics and the author of The Care and Feeding of Children.

Mendenhall began the second phase of her career in 1914 when she became a lecturer in the Department of Home Economics at the University of Wisconsin. The health issues and deaths of her two children inspired Dorothy to take special interest in maternal and infant health.  She decided to specifically focus on the issues of infant mortality. In 1915, Mendenhall was responsible for establishing Madison, Wisconsin's first infant welfare clinic. This establishment helped Madison to achieve the lowest infant mortality rate among cities in the United States.

Dorothy was called upon by the U.S. Children's Bureau during the WWI era. She was a medical officer for the bureau from 1917-1936.  She also worked on a nationwide drive to weigh and measure all children under six in order to call attention to the prevalence of malnutrition and develop norms for height and weight from birth through age six. She did studies relating to children in foreign countries such as France, England, and Belgium. Mendenhall focused much of her efforts on child nutrition by taking measurements of children ages six and below. Later on, Mendenhall would go on to visit Denmark to compare the infant mortality rates with that of the U.S.  She believed that excessive medical treatment was responsible for the high rates in the U.S. compared to Denmark.  She became an advocate for midwifery due to her research.

Personal life
While she was going to school in Baltimore, she met her husband, Charles Elwood Mendenhall, and the two were married in 1906 on Valentine's Day. The couple attended Johns Hopkins together and pursued a friendship while they were there. Dorothy wished to start a life with Charles after years of friendship, and she yearned for a sense of normalcy in her life.  After their marriage, the couple moved to Madison, Wisconsin where Both Charles and Dorothy would eventually go on to teach at the University of Wisconsin.

Dorothy and Charles Mendenhall had four children. Margaret, their first child, died one day after birth due to delivery complications.  Richard, their second child, survived his 1908 birth only to die before his second birthday from a fall off the roof of the family home in 1910. The Mendenhall's had two more boys who grew to be healthy and successful.  John attended Harvard University and became a renowned physician and faculty member at University of Wisconsin Medical School. Thomas attended and became a professor of history at Yale University, and served as the sixth president of Smith College, Dorothy's alma mater.

Charles Mendenhall died from prostate cancer in 1935. John, Thomas, and their families remained close to Dorothy after his passing. Dorothy began to travel in places such as Mexico and various parts of Central America. Eventually she ended up in Chester, Connecticut, where she would spend her last few years.  In the 1960s her health began to decline. Dorothy Reed Mendenhall lived a full life, and she died at the age of eighty-nine in July 1964. Her cause of death was arteriosclerotic heart disease.

Publications
Reed published two books, including Milk: The Indispensable Food for Children and What is Happening to Mothers and Babies in the District of Columbia? Aside from her own two publications, she also wrote six chapters Child Care and Child Welfare: Outlines for Study, which was published by the U.S. Children's Bureau. The Bureau published a third contribution of hers entitled Midwifery in Denmark. These publications were based on the research Mendenhall conducted oversees, as well as here in the U.S., in regard to child nutrition and health.

References

External links 
 Dorothy Reed Mendenhall papers at the Sophia Smith Collection, Smith College Special Collections

1874 births
1964 deaths
American pediatricians
Women pediatricians
Physicians from Ohio
Writers from Columbus, Ohio
Smith College alumni
Johns Hopkins School of Medicine alumni
Massachusetts Institute of Technology alumni
20th-century American physicians
20th-century American women physicians